Constitutional avoidance is a legal doctrine in United States constitutional law that dictates that United States federal courts should refuse to rule on a constitutional issue if the case can be resolved without involving constitutionality. When a federal court is faced with a choice of ruling on a statutory, regulatory, or constitutional basis, the Supreme Court of the United States has instructed the lower court to decide the federal constitutional issue only as a last resort: "The Court will not pass upon a constitutional question although properly presented by the record, if there is also present some other ground upon which the case may be disposed of." Ashwander v. Tennessee Valley Authority, 297 U.S. 288, 347 (1936) (Brandeis, J., concurring).

The avoidance doctrine flows from the canon of judicial restraint and is intertwined with the debate over the proper scope of federal judicial review and the allocation of power among the three branches of the federal government and the states. It is also premised on the "delicacy" and the "finality" of judicial review of legislation for constitutionality, concerns regarding the credibility of the federal courts, and the "paramount importance of constitutional adjudication in our system." Those elements demonstrate a significant overlap between the avoidance doctrine and other jurisdictional or justiciability barriers. The avoidance doctrine reflects such other justiciability doctrines as standing and ripeness, and permeates jurisdictional doctrines like Pullman abstention and the adequate and independent state ground doctrine.

History

The avoidance of unnecessary constitutional decisions has been urged as early as 1833 by Chief Justice of the United States John Marshall in Ex parte Randolph, 20 F. Cas. 242, 254 (C.C.D. Va. 1833) (No. 11,558).

Although Justice Louis Brandeis's concurring opinion in Ashwander is the primary case for the modern formulation of the avoidance doctrine, Marshall had cautioned that no questions of "greater delicacy" may be presented to the federal judiciary than those involving a constitutional challenge to a legislative act. He instructed that if such questions "become indispensably necessary to the case," they must be decided, but "if the case may be determined on other points, a just respect for the legislature requires, that the obligation of its laws should not be unnecessarily and wantonly assailed." In Ex parte Randolph, Marshall was riding circuit when he considered a challenge to a congressional act that provided that Treasury agents could issue warrants for military officers charged with disbursing public funds who failed to pay and to settle their accounts at the United States Department of the Treasury. The court concluded that the terms of the act did not apply to an officer temporarily acting as the ship's purser because of the death of the regularly-commissioned purser and granted his petition for habeas corpus.

Justice Brandeis's concurring opinion in Ashwander provides the most significant formulation of the avoidance doctrine, but his formulation had no effect on the outcome of the case because the Justice concurred in the plurality opinion, which considered and decided the properly-presented constitutional issues. In Ashwander, Justice Brandeis identified seven components of the avoidance doctrine.

Justice John Paul Stevens called the Ashwander concurrence "one of the most respected opinions ever written by a Member of this Court." Brandeis, a leader of the progressive movement prior to his judicial appointment, offered a broad framing of the avoidance doctrine. The doctrine was adopted heartily by Justice Felix Frankfurter, who was attacked as too "liberal" while he was a Harvard scholar and actively supported the New Deal programs. That tool of judicial restraint espoused by "liberals" was largely inspired by the response of Brandeis and Frankfurter to the activist "conservative" Supreme Court in the 1930s, which struck down legislation as infringing on freedom of contract and other doctrines such as substantive due process.

In recent years, doctrines of judicial restraint have more often been criticized when they are used by conservative jurists.

Dissent 
In the 1979 case NLRB v. Catholic Bishop of Chicago, Justice William J. Brennan Jr. wrote the dissent in which he argued that if the constitutional issue is not plainly clear in the argument, courts should avoid making the decision based on constitutional questions. In such instances, he argued that courts should decide if a particular interpretation is "fairly possible."

See also
Ashwander rules

References

Law of the United States